Avdotyino is a rural locality (a selo) in Krasnoselskoye Rural Settlement of Yuryev-Polsky District, Vladimir Oblast, Russia. The population was 197 as of 2010.

Geography 
Avdotyino is located 27 km southeast of Yuryev-Polsky (the district's administrative centre) by road. Karandyshevo is the nearest rural locality.

References 

Rural localities in Yuryev-Polsky District